The 1992 Brazilian motorcycle Grand Prix was the penultimate round of the 1992 Grand Prix motorcycle racing season. It took place on the weekend of 21–23 August 1992 at Interlagos.

500 cc race report
Riders were concerned about the track surface and bumpiness; with Michael Scott, Wayne Rainey, Eddie Lawson and Mick Doohan all against racing (which would have decided the championship for Doohan), but the race went on anyway.

John Kocinski took pole ahead of Rainey, Wayne Gardner and Kevin Schwantz. Doohan, returning from his crash in the TT Assen earlier in the year, qualified 14th.

Rainey took the lead from Kocinski and Schwantz, and built a gap from the close pack of Kocinski, Schwantz and Doug Chandler.

Kocinski eventually pulled a late-braking pass to move from 4th to 2nd, overtaking Chandler and Schwantz.

Rainey eventually won the race by over 13 seconds, closing his 20 point deficit to Doohan in the Riders' standings from 22 points to 2 points; helped by Doohan's non-points finish in 12th.

500cc classification

250cc classification

References

Brazilian motorcycle Grand Prix
Brazilian
Motorcycle Grand Prix